Dryden/TMC Station is an island platformed METRORail light rail station in Houston, Texas, United States. The station was opened on January 1, 2004, and is operated by the Metropolitan Transit Authority of Harris County, Texas (METRO). The station is located within the Texas Medical Center and is located at the intersection of Fannin Street and Dryden Road.

References

External links
Dryden/TMC; Arts in Transit (METRORail)

METRORail stations
Railway stations in the United States opened in 2004
2004 establishments in Texas
Texas Medical Center
Railway stations in Harris County, Texas